Merewai Cumu (born August 31, 1997) is a Fijian rugby sevens player. She was a member of the Fiji women's national rugby sevens team at the 2016 Summer Olympics. She also represented Fiji in sevens at the 2015 Commonwealth Youth Games in Samoa.

References

External links

 
 

1997 births
Living people
Rugby sevens players at the 2016 Summer Olympics
Olympic rugby sevens players of Fiji
Fijian female rugby union players
Fiji international women's rugby sevens players